93 may refer to: 
 93 (number)
 one of the years 93 BC, AD 93, 1993, 2093, etc.
 93 Seine-Saint-Denis, French department, Paris, Île-de-France
 Atomic number 93: neptunium
 Ninety-Three, English title of Quatrevingt-treize (same meaning), a novel by the French writer Victor Hugo
 Ninety-three (horse), a racehorse
 Saab 93
 United Airlines Flight 93, hijacked on September 11, 2001
 "93", a song by 6ix9ine from Day69

See also
 
 List of highways numbered